Gaiteros del Zulia is a professional basketball team based in Maracaibo, Venezuela. The team plays in Venezuela's Superliga Profesional de Baloncesto. They have won the Venezuelan championships four times.

Trophies
Liga Profesional de Baloncesto 
Champions (4): 1984, 1985, 1996, 2001

Roster

Notable players

References

External links
Official Website
Team Profile at Latinbasket.com
Team Twitter

Basketball teams established in 1983
Basketball teams in Venezuela
Sport in Maracaibo